Bartolomeo Pollastri was an 18th-century Italian mathematician and astronomer.

Works

See also 
 Double-entry bookkeeping system

18th-century Italian astronomers
18th-century Italian mathematicians
18th-century deaths